The Eastern College Athletic Conference (ECAC) is a college athletic conference comprising schools that compete in 15 sports (13 men's and 13 women's). It has 220 member institutions in NCAA Divisions I, II, and III, ranging in location from Maine to South Carolina and west to Missouri. Most or all members belong to at least one other athletic conference.

The ECAC was founded as the Central Office for Eastern Intercollegiate Athletics in 1938, largely through the efforts of James Lynah of Cornell University. In 1983, the Eastern Association of Intercollegiate Athletics for Women (EAIAW) was consolidated into the ECAC. Most member schools are in other conferences as well, but through the ECAC they are able to participate in sports that their main conferences do not offer. Its headquarters are located in Danbury, Connecticut. The ECAC also now offers esports competitions to its member schools.

Membership

Division I
As of spring 2018, there are 87 Division I members.

Division II
As of spring 2018, there are 26 Division II members.

Division III
As of spring 2018, there are 107 Division III members.

Affiliates
The ECAC has several affiliated single-sport leagues:
Eastern Association of Rowing Colleges
Eastern Association of Women's Rowing Colleges
ECAC Equestrian
Eastern Intercollegiate Gymnastics League
Intercollegiate Rowing Association
Intercollegiate Association of Amateur Athletes in America
ECAC Lacrosse League (defunct)
ECAC Division II Lacrosse League (defunct)
ECAC Hockey (independent since 2004)

Sports

ECAC men's basketball tournaments

At various times, the ECAC has organized regional college basketball championship tournaments at the end of the regular season for teams playing at the NCAA Division I, Division II, and Division III levels. It held the Division I tournaments from 1975 to 1982 to provide independent colleges and universities in the northeastern United States with a means of participating in end-of-season tournaments that resulted in the winning team receiving an automatic bid to the NCAA Division I men's basketball tournament, similar to the end-of-season tournaments held by conventional athletic conferences. The Division I ECAC tournaments were discontinued after all participating schools joined conferences of their own during the late 1970s and early 1980s.

The ECAC also held combined Division II/III regional end-of- season tournaments from 1973 to 1980 and a single Division II-only tournament after the regular season from 1988 to 2006 and in 2007, 2008, and 2014. Since 1981, it has organized regional Division III-only men's basketball tournaments annually at the end of each regular season.

ECAC Division III football bowls
In football, the ECAC organizes six NCAA Division III bowl games each year, three in its North region and three in its South region. The conference selects six ECAC member teams from the North region and six teams from the South region to participate in the bowls and seeds them one through six in each region, with the top three seeds in each region serving as the host institutions for the games.
North Region:
ECAC Northwest Bowl
ECAC North Atlantic Bowl
ECAC Northeast Bowl 
South Region:
ECAC Southwest Bowl
ECAC South Atlantic Bowl
ECAC Southeast Bowl

Awards
See footnotes
Div. I FBS Football Major Awards 
Div. I FCS Football Major Awards
Div II Football Major Awards
Div. III Football Major Awards
Robbins Scholar-Athletes
Award of Merit (for student-athletes)
Award of Valor (for student-athletes)
ECAC Rowing Trophy

See also
 ECAC Hockey, a Division I ice hockey conference previously affiliated with the ECAC
 Mountain Pacific Sports Federation, a similar Division I conference in the western U.S.

References

External links
 

 
Sports leagues established in 1938
1938 establishments in the United States